Néboa is a Spanish mystery-thriller television series starring Emma Suárez and Isabel Naveira. Created by Xosé Morais, Víctor Sierra and Alberto Guntín, produced by RTVE and Voz Audiovisual and set in Galicia, the plot concerns the investigation on a series of serial murders taking place in a small island community during the carnival. It aired on La 1 in 2020.

Premise 
The story is set in Néboa, a fictional island off the coast of A Coruña, in Galicia. The corpse of a teenager appears during the first night of the entroido carnival in Néboa. The murder mimics the pattern of past killings that occurred in 1919 and 1989, both of which sparked a serial killing row with multiple deaths. Locals believe the killer is the Urco, a wolf headed man from the folk stories. Three Guardia Civil agents, Mónica Ortiz, Carmela Souto and Lieutenant Ferro try to solve the mystery and avoid another serial killing rampage.

Cast 
 Emma Suárez as Mónica Ortiz, a UCO agent arriving from Madrid.
  as Carmela Souto, a local Guardia Civil sergeant in Néboa who teams up with Mónica.
  as Sargento Viqueira.
  as Vega, Mónica's daughter.
  as Cascudo, a surfer earning a life as drug dealer.
 Denisse Peña as Ana, a girl, first victim of the Urco.
 Nancho Novo as Lieutenant Ferro.
 Nacho Nugo as Gael, Ana's friend.
 Carmela Martíns as Comba, Ana's friend.
 Jorge Varandela as Roi, Ana's friend.
 Santi Cuquejo as Turco, Ana's friend.
  as Alejandro, the head of the powerful Ulloa family, kingpins of the local canning industry.
  as Mara, Alejandro's wife.
  as Antón, Ana's father, working for the Ulloa family.
 María Vázquez as Rosa, Ana's mother, childhood friend of Carmela.
  as Roque, Carmela's husband and Antón's best friend.
  as Gonzalo.
  as Olaia, Cascudo's girlfriend.
 Gonzalo Ramos as Emilio.

Production and release 
The series was produced by RTVE and the Galician production company Voz Audiovisual. It was created by Xosé Morais, Víctor Sierra and Alberto Guntín. The episodes were directed by  Gonzalo López-Gallego, Jorge Saavedra and Manu Gómez. It was primarily filmed from May to September 2019 in Ortegal, in the north of the province of A Coruña. Other locations included Estaca de Bares, O Barqueiro, Ortigueira and Cariño. Most cast members were Galician (a notable exception being Emma Suárez). The first episode premiered in prime time on La 1 on 15 January 2020. The weekly broadcasting run of the 8-episode series ended on 4 March 2020.

Awards and nominations 

|-
| align = "center" rowspan = "6" | 2021 || rowspan = "6" | 19th Mestre Mateo Awards || colspan = "2" | Best Television Series ||  || rowspan = "6" | 
|-
| Best Art Direction || || 
|-
| Best Cinematography Direction || || 
|-
| Best Costume Design || || 
|-
| Best Makeup and Hairstyling || || 
|-
| Best Lead Actress || Isabel Naveira || 
|}

References 

2020 Spanish television series debuts
2020s Spanish drama television series
Spanish thriller television series
Television shows filmed in Spain
La 1 (Spanish TV channel) network series
2020s mystery television series
Television shows set in Galicia (Spain)
Spanish mystery television series
2020s Spanish television series endings
Spanish crime television series
Spanish-language television shows